Diana is a musical with music and lyrics by David Bryan and Joe DiPietro, and a book by DiPietro, based on the life of Diana, Princess of Wales. A filmed performance was added to the streaming service Netflix on October 1 2021, to negative reviews.

Productions 
Previews for Diana began on February 19, 2019, at the La Jolla Playhouse. The world premiere of Diana opened the following month on March 3. The limited run was extended twice and closed on April 14, 2019. The production was directed by Christopher Ashley with choreography by Kelly Devine. Costumes were designed by William Ivey Long and Nic Rackow, Scenic design was designed by David Zinn, Lighting was designed by Natasha Katz, and Sound was designed by Gareth Owen. The production's orchestrations were composed by John Clancy.

Following the La Jolla production, the producers continued workshopping the musical. The production was eventually picked up and began previews at the Longacre Theatre on Broadway on March 2, 2020 with the same directing team.

The show was planned to open on March 31, 2020, but on March 12 the show suspended production due to the COVID-19 pandemic. On March 30, 2021, it was announced the show would resume previews on December 1, with an official opening set for December 16. On May 14, 2021, it was announced that previews would begin on November 2, with an opening night set for November 17, nearly a month earlier than initially announced.The New York Times reported that the show played to 51 percent capacity and grossed $374,000 in the week ending December 12, 2021.  The show closed on December 19 after a total of 33 performances and 16 previews.

As of January 11th, 2023, the show is now available for licensing through Broadway Licensing for both professional regional and amateur productions.

Live stage filming
Before opening, the Broadway production was recorded in the summer of 2020 with COVID-19 safety protocols in place and no audience. This capture, also directed by Ashley, was released on Netflix on October 1, 2021. The recording was universally panned by critics and won five of its nine nominations at the 42nd Golden Raspberry Awards, including Worst Picture, the first filmed stage performance with this distinction.

Plot

Act 1

In 1980, Diana Spencer attends a party thrown by Prince Charles, and meets Camilla Parker Bowles, Charles' mistress ("Underestimated"). Meanwhile, Queen Elizabeth II is looking for Charles to get married, and he brings up Diana as a possibility, although he has recently broken off a relationship with her older sister Sarah. The Queen encourages Charles to begin the courting process, as she believes Diana would be perfect for what the staff calls "The Worst Job in England".

Charles sends Diana a necklace and invites her to a performance by cellist Mstislav Rostropovich. There, she meets Camilla again and starts to become a lot more suspicious of her and her relationship with Charles. While the performance is going on, she imagines a more punk-rock version of the concert, more in line with her interests ("This Is How Your People Dance"). The press takes note of Diana's growing relationship with Charles and starts hounding her ("Snap, Click"). Charles is still unsure about marrying Diana, but the Queen tells him that he can keep his close relationship with Camilla while marrying Diana. Charles proposes to her, but tells Camilla he will break it off if that's what she wants. Camilla tells Charles to go ahead with the wedding, and he assures her he will be there for her. A nervous Diana moves in to Buckingham Palace ("Whatever Love Means Anyway"). Soon after, despite some reservations from Diana, she and Charles get married. ("I Will"). Camilla's husband Andrew, having affairs of his own, assures Camilla that they will make their own complicated marriage work ("I Will (Tag)").

Diana's first public appearance happens in Wales, and even though the townsfolk are skeptical at first, they, as well as the whole country, become enamored with Diana. Charles starts to become jealous of Diana's newfound fame ("The World Fell in Love"). Camilla tells Charles that Andrew has cut off all his other relations, hoping to reignite their own marriage, and Camilla breaks up the affair, saying she would be the most hated woman in England if she was found out. Diana tells Charles that she is pregnant, and soon after their son William is born. Diana walks in on Charles talking sweetly on the phone to Camilla, who he hasn't talked to in months. Camilla says that Andrew is being stationed more and more overseas. Diana is very hurt by Charles' lack of affection towards her and becomes depressed, even after having their second child Harry. This culminates in her smashing a window with her hand ("Happiness/Simply Breathe").

Sarah convinces Diana to fight back and do more with her power, so she decides to become more and more involved with charity, leading to even more popularity, especially after a surprise performance at the Royal Ballet Christmas Gala ("She Moves in the Most Modern Ways"). Charles is enraged at this and reminds Diana that her only achievement is marrying him ("Diana (The Rage)"). Diana realizes this might be the end of any hope of love in her marriage ("As I Love You"). Charles visits Camilla late at night and she says she still loves him and would like to continue their affair ("I Miss You Most on Sundays"). Diana decides to use the press and newfound popularity to get back at Charles and fight back against the norms of British society. Despite Charles' attempt to fight back, she succeeds and becomes more popular ("Pretty, Pretty Girl").

Act 2

Barbara Cartland, novelist and Diana's step-grandmother, introduces the audience to James Hewitt, a war hero who has recently come home. He and Diana begin their own affair ("Here Comes James Hewitt"). Barbara notes that the two affairs between Diana and James as well as Charles and Camilla are filled with more love and happiness than Charles and Diana's marriage ("Him and Her (and Him and Her)"). Diana tries to talk to Charles, but he wants to "Just Dance". Charles' valet Colin lets him know of Diana and James' relationship, but he decides to let it go as he is happy with Camilla.

Diana goes to a clinic for AIDS patients and bonds with the men there ("Secrets and Lies"). Soon after, Diana learns that Charles and Camilla go out almost every night with their friends, and Diana decides to crash a party for Camilla's sister. At the party, their friends, usually bored by Charles, are excited that they get to witness "The Main Event", which leads to a confrontation between Diana, Camilla, and Charles. On the car ride home, Charles reveals he knows about Diana's relationship with James, which he says he doesn't care about and that the boys will be fine as long as they both love them ("Whatever Love Means Anyway (Reprise)"). Diana is excited to tell James, but he reveals that he has been stationed in Germany and will be there for two years. Diana, suspecting Charles, vows to get revenge ("Pretty, Pretty Girl (Reprise)"). The press increasingly hounds Charles about his failing marriage ("Snap, Click (Reprise)"). Diana contacts Andrew Morton, a writer who is writing a book on her, and agrees to give anonymous quotes to him, bashing Charles, Camilla, and the monarchy. The book is published and is the talk of the country ("The Words Came Pouring Out").

Charles tries to get the Queen to meet Camilla, but she refuses. Charles decides to go on TV, tell the truth about his affair, and try to win back some favor from the public ("I Miss You Most on Sundays (Reprise)"). Diana learns about the interview from Paul, her butler and friend, who comes up with the idea that she draw attention away from it by wearing a "F-You" Dress ("The Dress"). The Queen has had enough and agrees to a divorce between Diana and Charles. She laments that it didn't work out while reflecting on her own marriage ("An Officer's Wife"), and tells Diana "don't be foolish". Diana is excited to start a new life with her boys, however it is tragically cut short by a car accident. Charles and the company tell the audience that "the people who will change the world are not the ones you think will change the world." ("If (Light of the World)")

Musical numbers
La Jolla Playhouse

Act 1
 "Once Upon a Time"
 "In the Pages of Her Books"
 "Snap, Click"
 "This Is How Your People Dance"
 "Whatever Love Means Anyway"
 "The Wedding"
 "Welcome to the Windsors"
 "Perfect Princess"
 "Happiness"
 "Simply Breathe"
 "Princess Di Floating"
 "Diana (The Rage)"
 "As I Love You"
 "Pretty, Pretty Girl"

Act 2
 "Here Comes James Hewitt"
 "Him & Her (& Him & Her)"
 "Just Dance"
 "Secrets and Lies"
 "The Show"
 "The Words Came Pouring Out"
 "Diana (Reprise)"
 "The Dress"
 "An Officer’s Wife"
 "If"

Broadway

Act I
 "Underestimated" - Diana and Ensemble
 "The Worst Job in England" - Servants, Queen Elizabeth, Prince Charles
 "This Is How You People Dance" - Diana, Prince Charles and Ensemble
 "This is How You People Dance – Tag" † - Camilla
 "Snap, Click" - Ensemble
 "Whatever Love Means Anyway" - Queen Elizabeth, Prince Charles, Camilla, Barbara Cartland, Diana, Paul and Ensemble
 "I Will" - Diana, Prince Charles and Ensemble
 "I Will (Tag)" † - Andrew, Camilla
 "The World Fell in Love" - Prince Charles, Queen Elizabeth, Diana and Ensemble
 "Happiness/Simply Breathe" - Diana, Prince Charles and Ensemble
 "She Moves in the Most Modern Ways" - Queen Elizabeth, Camilla, Sarah, Prince Charles, Paul, Colin and Ensemble
 "Diana (The Rage)" - Prince Charles
 "As I Love You" - Diana
 "I Miss You Most on Sundays" - Camilla
 "Pretty, Pretty Girl" - Diana, Sarah, Camilla, Prince Charles, Queen Elizabeth and Ensemble

Act II
 "Here Comes James Hewitt" - Barbara, James and Ensemble
 "Him & Her (& Him & Her)" - James, Diana, Barbara, Prince Charles and Camilla
 "Just Dance" - Prince Charles, Diana, James, Colin, Camilla and Ensemble
 "Secrets and Lies" - Graham, Diana and Ensemble
 "The Main Event" - Diana, Camilla, Prince Charles and Ensemble
 "Whatever Love Means Anyway – Reprise" - Prince Charles
 "Pretty, Pretty Girl – Reprise" - Diana
 "Snap, Click (Reprise)" † – Ensemble
 "The Words Came Pouring Out" - Diana, Andrew Morton, Camilla, Queen Elizabeth, Prince Charles and Ensemble
 "I Miss You Most on Sundays – Reprise" † - Camilla
 "The Dress" - Paul, Diana, Queen Elizabeth and Ensemble
 "The Servant Quartet" † - Servants
 "An Officer's Wife" - Queen Elizabeth and Ensemble
 "If (Light The World)" - Diana and Ensemble
† Not featured on the cast recording.

Casting

Reception
The La Jolla production received mostly negative reviews from critics. Charles McNulty of the Los Angeles Times wrote: "The score is actually closer to commercial Broadway in the early aughts, an even more dated style to my ear." The Guardian gave the Netflix recording a one-star review, stating "If it was deliberate satire it would be genius, but it’s not."

Jesse Green, chief theater critic for The New York Times, negatively reviewed the production at Broadway's Longacre Theatre, deeming it tawdry and exploitative, and writing, "if you care about Diana as a human being, or dignity as a concept, you will find this treatment of her life both aesthetically and morally mortifying."

The Netflix presentation currently has a score of 12% on Rotten Tomatoes, based on 34 reviews, with an average rating of 3.10/10. The website's critics consensus reads: "Diana done dirty". Metacritic gave the film a rating of 29.

Accolades

References

External links 
 Diana at La Jolla Playhouse
 Diana on Rotten Tomatoes
 Official website 
 Netflix
 Official trailer

2019 musicals
Biographical musicals
Cultural depictions of Diana, Princess of Wales
Cultural depictions of Charles III
Cultural depictions of Elizabeth II
Filmed stage productions
Golden Raspberry Award winning films
Plays set in the 1980s
Plays set in the 1990s
Plays set in the United Kingdom
Sung-through musical films